Suleiman Stalsky (18 May 1869 – 23 November 1937) was a Lezgin poet from Dagestan. Russian writer Maxim Gorky described him as "Homer of 20th century".

Legacy
Suleyman-Stalsky District, where his native village Ashaga-Stal is located, was renamed in his honor on the 100th anniversary of his birthday.

References

External links

"Suleyman Stalsky House Museum restored in Dagestan"

1869 births
1937 deaths
People from Suleyman-Stalsky District
People from Dagestan Oblast
Poets from Dagestan
Russian people of Lezgian descent
Russian male poets